Edwin Thomas Ryan (1912-1978) was an English boxer who competed for England.

Boxing career
Ryan won a gold medal in the bantamweight division at the 1934 British Empire Games in London.

Ryan was the ABA bantamweight runner-up to Welshman Albert Barnes in 1934 but defeated Barnes on points in the Empire Games final. He stepped up in weight to featherweight the following year (1935) and won the ABA Championship. Known as the Peckham Pulverizer, he defeated Johnny Cabello, a New York Puerto Rican in the New York Golden Gloves tournament during 1935. On 8 December 1935, in the Oslo Colosseum, he fought Kr. Torvund in England's first match against Norway.

Personal life
He was a warehouse labourer and painter by trade and lived at 22 Horny Broad, Peckham in 1935.

References

1912 births
1978 deaths
English male boxers
Commonwealth Games gold medallists for England
Commonwealth Games medallists in boxing
Boxers at the 1934 British Empire Games
Bantamweight boxers
Medallists at the 1934 British Empire Games